Dmitrov is a town in Dmitrovsky District of Moscow Oblast, Russia.

Dmitrov may also refer to:
Dmitrov Urban Settlement, a municipal formation which the Town of Dmitrov in Dmitrovsky District of Moscow Oblast, Russia is incorporated as
FC Dmitrov, an association football club based in Dmitrov, Russia
HC Dmitrov, an ice hockey team based in Dmitrov, Russia